Mario Lolini (born 27 January 1958) is an Italian politician who served as a Deputy from 23 March 2018 to 13 October 2022. On 24 December 2020, he has been appointed Federal Commissioner of Lega Nord Toscana by Matteo Salvini.

References

Bibliography

1958 births
Politicians from Grosseto
Lega Nord politicians
Deputies of Legislature XVIII of Italy
Living people